This is a list of notable alumni of the Indian Institute of Technology Madras.

Academia

Deans, directors, and presidents

Professors and scholars

Arts and entertainment

Humanities and social sciences

Industry

Government and politics

Military and defense

Notable faculty

References

External links
 Official website
 Office of Alumni Affairs, IIT Madras

Indian Institute of Technology Madras
Indian Institute of Technology Madras
 
Indian Institutes of Technology
Indian Institutes of Technology people